The athletics competition at the 2011 Summer Universiade has been held at the New Shenzhen Stadium in Shenzhen, China from August 16 to August 21, 2011.

Medal summary

Men's events

Women's events

Medal summary

Medal table

Participating nations

 (9)
 (9)
 (2)
 (17)
 (2)
 (1)
 (2)
 (2)
 (11)
 (11)
 (1)
 (2)
 (2)
 (12)
 (16)
 (3)
 (2)
 (2)
 (2)
 (34)
 (2)
 (6)
 (69)
 (3)
 (2)
 (1)
 (2)
 (2)
 (5)
 (6)
 (11)
 (1)
 (11)
 (1)
 (4)
 (3)
 (30)
 (2)
 (1)
 (5)
 (16)
 (12)
 (1)
 (18)
 (16)
 (24)
 (3)
 (1)
 (4)
 (10)
 (9)
 (7)
 (6)
 (9)
 (1)
 (8)
 (2)
 (22)
 (12)
 (32)
 (13)
 (13)
 (17)
 (9)
 (2)
 (26)
 (1)
 (10)
 (1)
 (20)
 (7)
 (3)
 (1)
 (7)
 (2)
 (6)
 (2)
 (5)
 (9)
 (1)
 (7)
 (3)
 (13)
 (9)
 (1)
 (3)
 (4)
 (4)
 (3)
 (26)
 (12)
 (4)
 (12)
 (74)
 (2)
 (16)
 (6)
 (2)
 (6)
 (4)
 (14)
 (35)
 (16)
 (16)
 (10)
 (2)
 (2)
 (7)
 (14)
 (2)
 (1)
 (18)
 (1)
 (19)
 (8)
 (22)
 (3)
 (19)
 (1)
 (6)
 (2)
 (4)
 (5)

References

Schedule/results
van Kuijen, Hans (2011-08-22). World University Games conclude in Shenzhen – Wrap report. IAAF. Retrieved on 2011-09-13.

 
2011 Summer Universiade events
2011
Universiade
2011 Summer Universiade